The episodes of the Japanese anime television series Gankutsuou: The Count of Monte Cristo are directed by Mahiro Maeda and animated and produced by Gonzo. Gankutsuou is based on Alexandre Dumas's French novel, Le Comte de Monte-Cristo and is about the coming-of-age of Albert Morcerf and the revenge of the Count of Monte Cristo.

The series first aired in Japan on Animax on October 5, 2004, and the final episode aired on March 29, 2005. Media Factory released the series to twelve DVD compilations in Japan between February 25, 2005 and January 25, 2006. On April 10, 2005, Geneon Entertainment received the license for U.S. releases. The U.S. version went straight to six DVD compilations of four episodes each between October 25, 2005 and September 12, 2006. Gankutsuou was also made available over the now defunct Akimbo video-on-demand service, Xbox Live, and via Vuze. On December 27, 2010, the series made its North American debut on the FUNimation Channel. Gankutsuou only has one opening theme and one closing theme, both by Jean-Jacques Burnel. "We Were Lovers" serves as the opening theme for all episodes except episode twenty-three and serves as the closing theme for the season finale, episode twenty-four. "You Won't See Me Coming" was the ending theme for every episode aside from the season finale.

Episode list

References

External links
 Official Gankutsuou website 
 Madman Entertainment's official Gankutsuou website

Gankutsuou